Chris Thompson (born July 4, 1971) is a Canadian musician who has performed in a variety of Maritime bands, including Eric's Trip, The Memories Attack, Orange Glass, and his solo project Moon Socket. Although Thompson was born in Ottawa, his family moved to Moncton, New Brunswick when he was five years old. Thompson began Moon Socket before Eric's Trip had broken up.

Thompson contributed to former Eric's Trip bandmate Julie Doiron's 2007 album Woke Myself Up.

As of 2022, Thompson is also a member of the rock bands Diamondtown since September 2018, and Gemstones, since February 2021.

Moon Socket discography

LPs 
 Eurydice (2015)
 Moon Socket (1995)
 The Best Thing] (1996)
 Take the Mountain Squirtgun Records (1997)

EPs 
 Spaced-Odd-Ditties (1993)
 Moon Socket (1995)
 Moon Socket (1995)
 It's the End of the Trip (1997)

Singles 
 "Accept Fear" (1995)
 "Feeling Around" (1995)
 "I Want Now" (1996)

See also

Music of Canada
Canadian rock
List of Canadian musicians

References

External links
 The Memories Attack on Myspace
 Eric's Trip Live Archive – Guide to Eric's Trip's studio sessions and live concerts, including side-projects.

1971 births
Living people
Canadian indie rock musicians
Canadian male singer-songwriters
Canadian singer-songwriters
Musicians from Moncton
Musicians from Ottawa
21st-century Canadian male singers